The Journal of the ACM is a peer-reviewed scientific journal covering computer science in general, especially theoretical aspects. It is an official journal of the Association for Computing Machinery. Its current editor-in-chief is Venkatesan  Guruswami.

The journal was established in 1954 and "computer scientists universally hold the Journal of the ACM in high esteem".

See also 
 Communications of the ACM

References

External links 
 

Publications established in 1954
Computer science journals
Association for Computing Machinery academic journals
Bimonthly journals
English-language journals